Baron Divavesi Waqa (born 31 December 1959) is a Nauruan politician who was the 14th President of Nauru from 11 June 2013 until 27 August 2019. He previously served as Minister of Education from 2004 to 2007.

Background
Waqa has a master's degree from Monash University, Clayton, Australia, and a bachelor's degree from the University of the South Pacific in Suva, Fiji.

Political role
Waqa was elected in the May 2003 elections to the Parliament of Nauru, representing the constituency of Boe.  Under President Ludwig Scotty, he served as Minister of the Interior and of Education; however, he had to leave the post upon Scotty's replacement by René Harris.  He kept his seat in Parliament.

On 23 April 2004, Waqa and his colleagues Kieren Keke, David Adeang and Fabian Ribauw participated in protests at the Nauru International Airport in Yaren; these were meant to show displeasure regarding government policy against Afghan asylum-seekers in Australia and the Flotilla of Hope, as well as against the deadlock then encountered in Parliament.  All four faced up to fourteen years in jail because of their participation in the protest; charges were dropped, however, upon Scotty's re-ascension the following June. Scotty once again appointed Waqa to be Minister of Education.

Waqa remained loyal to his Administration during the ministerial crisis which occurred in 2007. Consequently, Waqa was not invited to serve in the subsequent Administration of President Marcus Stephen which later took office.

Waqa was elected president in June, defeating former Finance Minister and opposition nominee Roland Kun by a vote of 13 to 5. He was chosen by the government faction after President Dabwido stepped aside to allow for Waqa's election so that government members could remain in power.

In January 2014, he survived a vote of confidence over his deportation of the Australian resident magistrate Peter Law and the cancelling of the visa of the Chief Justice Geoffrey Eames, also an Australian national. The government also sought to draft an emergency rule law with the help of Fijian lawyers. It followed the dismissal of the parliamentary counsel Katy Le Roy and the subsequent resignation of the Solicitor-General Steven Bliim, both of whom were Australian. Home Minister Charmaine Scotty said this was symptomatic of a "system of cronyism" operated by Australian expatriates who he said were in league with the opposition.

In 2019 Nauruan parliamentary election he lost his parliamentary seat and his bid to be re-elected in the office.

Honors and awards
:
 Grand Cordon of the Order of Brilliant Jade (March 2019)

Personal life
He is married to Louisa Waqa. They have adopted one child together, named Barron Stephenson.

See also
 Politics of Nauru 
List of foreign ministers in 2017
List of current foreign ministers

References

External links 
 

1959 births
Government ministers of Nauru
Living people
Members of the Parliament of Nauru
Nauruan composers
People from Boe District
Presidents of Nauru
Foreign Ministers of Nauru
21st-century Nauruan politicians
University of the South Pacific alumni
Monash University alumni
Education ministers of Nauru